A giggle is a high-pitched, bubbly laugh.

Giggle or Giggles may also refer to: 
Giggles the Pig, a 2015 mayoral candidate in Flint, Michigan
Giggles (Happy Tree Friends), a chipmunk character from Happy Tree Friends
Giggle (comic), a British comic book that merged with Buster
"Giggles", an episode of The Little Mermaid
"The Giggle", an episode of Phil of the Future
Jimmy Giggle, a character on Australian children's television show Giggle and Hoot
Giggles, a discontinued American version of the British biscuit Happy Faces